Portrait of Benedetto Varchi, also called Portrait of a Man, is an oil painting by Titian. It was painted in around 1540, and hangs today in the Kunsthistorisches Museum in Vienna.

Analysis 
According to Walter Gronau, the indication that the person here represented is Benedetto Varchi, the Florentine historian and humanist scholar, seems in no way proved. It is signed "Titianus F.", with some repainting. Though restored, Gronau thinks it a genuine work by Titian. From the style, he thinks that this portrait must have been painted about 1550, possibly somewhat later. The Kunsthistorisches Museum, however, identifies the sitter as Benedetto Varchi without any qualification, and states that it was probably painted during his stay in Venice in 1536–1540.

Provenance 

 1636—Collection of Bartolomeo della Nave, Venice; 
 1638–1649—Collection of the Duke of Hamilton; 
 1659 —Collection of Archduke Leopold Wilhelm, Vienna.

Gallery

References

Sources 

 Gronau, Georg (1904). Titian. London: Duckworth and Co; New York: Charles Scribner's Sons. p. 276.
 Ricketts, Charles (1910). Titian. London: Methuen & Co. Ltd. p. 176, plate cxix.
 "Benedetto Varchi". Kunsthistorisches Museum Wien. Retrieved 23 November 2022.

Portraits by Titian
Paintings in the collection of the Kunsthistorisches Museum